"Judith" is a song by American rock band A Perfect Circle. It was released as the lead single from their debut album, Mer de Noms. The single was released as a 1-track compact disc single in North America, and a 4-track single on both disc and vinyl format in Australia.

Background
Maynard Keenan explains on the Amotion DVD how the song is about his mother Judith Marie Keenan, who had a stroke and was reliant on a wheelchair for the rest of her life, yet still believed in Christianity.

Composition
"Judith" features guitar riffs sliding over complex rhythms and breakdowns. The song's lyrics are deeply personal and express palpable anger. They touch on Maynard's mother, who became reliant on a wheelchair following a stroke, and have him conveying incredulity that she could still maintain her belief in God despite her suffering.

Music video
The music video for Judith was directed by David Fincher, the director of Fight Club, Se7en, and music videos for Aerosmith, Madonna, and the Wallflowers.

Track listing
"Judith" – 4:03
"Magdalena" (live) – 4:15
"Breña" (live) – 4:04
"Orestes" (demo) – 3:24

Charts

References

External links

2000 debut singles
A Perfect Circle songs
Songs critical of religion
Music videos directed by David Fincher
Songs written by Maynard James Keenan
Songs written by Billy Howerdel
Industrial rock songs
2000 songs
Virgin Records singles
Song recordings produced by Alan Moulder